Peter Lawrence Boyle (October 18, 1935 – December 12, 2006) was an American actor. Known as a character actor, he played Frank Barone on the CBS sitcom Everybody Loves Raymond and the comical monster in Mel Brooks' film spoof Young Frankenstein (1974). He also starred in The Candidate (1972). Boyle, who won an Emmy Award in 1996 for a guest-starring role on the Fox science-fiction drama The X-Files, won praise in both comedic and dramatic parts following his breakthrough performance in the 1970 film Joe, and as Wizard in Taxi Driver (1976).

Early life
Peter Lawrence Boyle was born in Norristown, Pennsylvania, the son of Alice (née Lewis) and Francis Xavier Boyle. He was the youngest of three children and had two elder sisters: Alice Duffy (nee Boyle) and Sidney Boyle. He moved with his family to nearby Philadelphia. 

His father, Francis, was a Philadelphia TV personality from 1951 to 1963. Among many other roles, he played the Western show host Chuck Wagon Pete, as well as hosting the after-school children's program Uncle Pete Presents the Little Rascals, which showed vintage Little Rascals and Three Stooges comedy shorts alongside Popeye cartoons. He also appeared at times on Ernie Kovacs' morning program on WPTZ (now KYW-TV).

Boyle's paternal grandparents were Irish immigrants, and his mother was of mostly French, British and Irish descent. He was raised Catholic and attended St. Francis de Sales School and West Philadelphia Catholic High School for Boys. After graduating high school in 1953, Boyle spent three years in formation with the De La Salle Brothers, a Roman Catholic teaching order. He lived in a house of studies with other novices earning a Bachelor of Arts degree from La Salle University in Philadelphia in 1957, but left the order because he did not feel called to religious life.

While in Philadelphia, he worked as a cameraman on the cooking show Television Kitchen hosted by Florence Hanford.

After graduating from Officer Candidate School in 1959, he was commissioned as an ensign in the United States Navy, but his military career was shortened by a nervous breakdown. In New York City, Boyle studied with acting coach Uta Hagen at HB Studio while working as a postal clerk and a maitre d'.

Boyle played Murray the cop in a touring company of Neil Simon's The Odd Couple, leaving the tour in Chicago and joining The Second City ensemble there. He had a brief scene as the manager of an indoor shooting range in the critically acclaimed 1969 film Medium Cool, filmed in Chicago.

Career
Boyle gained acclaim for his first starring role as the title character, a bigoted New York City factory worker, in the 1970 movie Joe. The film's release was surrounded by controversy over its violence and language. During this time, Boyle became close friends with actress Jane Fonda, and he participated with her in many protests against the Vietnam War. After seeing people cheer at his role in Joe, Boyle refused the lead role in The French Connection (1971), as well as other film and television roles that he believed glamorized violence. However, in 1974, he starred in a film based on the life of murdered New York gangster "Crazy" Joey Gallo, called Crazy Joe.

His next major role was as the campaign manager for a U.S. Senate candidate (Robert Redford) in The Candidate (1972). In 1973, he appeared in Steelyard Blues with Jane Fonda and Donald Sutherland, a film about a bunch of misfits trying to get a Catalina flying boat in a scrapyard flying again so they could fly away to somewhere with not so many rules. He also played an Irish mobster opposite Robert Mitchum in The Friends of Eddie Coyle (1973).

Boyle had another hit role as Frankenstein's monster in the 1974 Mel Brooks comedy Young Frankenstein, in which, in an homage to King Kong, the monster is placed onstage in top hat and tails, grunt-singing and dancing to "Puttin' on the Ritz". Boyle said at the time, "The Frankenstein monster I play is a baby. He's big and ugly and scary, but he's just been born, remember, and it's been traumatic, and to him the whole world is a brand-new, alien environment. That's how I'm playing it". Boyle met his wife, Loraine Alterman, on the set of Young Frankenstein while she was there as a reporter for Rolling Stone. He was still in his Frankenstein makeup when he asked her for a date. Through Alterman and her friend Yoko Ono, Boyle became friends with John Lennon, who was the best man at Boyle and Alterman's 1977 wedding. Boyle and his wife had two daughters, Lucy and Amy.

Boyle received his first Emmy nomination for his acclaimed dramatic performance in the 1977 television film Tail Gunner Joe, in which he played Senator Joseph McCarthy. Yet, he was more often cast as a character actor than as a leading man. His roles include the philosophical cab driver Wizard in Martin Scorsese's Taxi Driver (1976), starring Robert De Niro; a bar owner and fence in The Brink's Job (1978); the private detective hired in Hardcore (1979); the attorney of gonzo journalist Hunter S. Thompson (played by Bill Murray) in Where the Buffalo Roam (1980); a corrupt space mining-facility boss in the science-fiction film Outland (1981), opposite Sean Connery; Boatswain Moon in the (1983) pirate comedy Yellowbeard, also starring Cheech and Chong, Madeline Kahn, and members of the comedy troupe Monty Python; a local crime boss named Jocko Dundee on his way to retirement, starring Michael Keaton in the comedy film Johnny Dangerously (1984); a psychiatric patient who belts out a Ray Charles song in the comedy The Dream Team (1989), also starring Michael Keaton; a boss of an unscrupulous corporation in the sci-fi movie Solar Crisis (1990) with Charlton Heston and Jack Palance; the title character's cab driver in The Shadow (1994), starring Alec Baldwin; the father of Sandra Bullock's fiancée in While You Were Sleeping (1995); the corporate raider out to buy Eddie Murphy's medical partnership in Dr. Dolittle (1998); the hateful father of Billy Bob Thornton's prison-guard character in Monster's Ball (2001); Muta in The Cat Returns (2002); and Old Man Wickles in the comedy Scooby Doo 2: Monsters Unleashed (2004). In cameo roles, he can be seen as a police captain in Malcolm X (1992), and as a drawbridge operator in Porky's Revenge (1985). In 1992, he starred in Alex Cox's Death and the Compass, an adaptation of Jorge Luis Borges' La Muerte y la Brujula. However, the film was not released until 1996.

His New York theater work included playing a comedian who is the object of The Roast, a 1980 Broadway play directed by Carl Reiner. Also in 1980, he co-starred with Tommy Lee Jones in an off-Broadway production of playwright Sam Shepard's acclaimed True West. Two years later, Boyle played the head of a dysfunctional family in Joe Pintauro's less well-received Snow Orchid, at the Circle Repertory.

In 1986, Boyle played the title role of the television series Joe Bash, created by Danny Arnold. The comedy drama followed the life of a lonely, world-weary, and sometimes compromised New York City beat cop, whose closest friend was a prostitute, played by actress DeLane Matthews.

In October 1990, Boyle suffered a near-fatal stroke that rendered him completely speechless and immobile for nearly six months. After recovering, he went on to win an Emmy Award in 1996 as Outstanding Guest Actor in a Drama Series for his appearance on The X-Files. In the episode, "Clyde Bruckman's Final Repose", he played an insurance salesman who could see selected things in the near future, particularly others' deaths. Boyle also guest-starred in two episodes as Bill Church Sr. in Lois and Clark: The New Adventures of Superman. He appears in Sony Music's unaired Roger Waters music video "Three Wishes" (1992) as a scruffy genie in a dirty coat and red scarf, who tries to tempt Waters at a desert diner.

Boyle played Frank Barone in the CBS sitcom Everybody Loves Raymond, which aired from 1996 to 2005. He was nominated for an Emmy seven times for this role and never won, though fellow co-stars Brad Garrett, Ray Romano, Patricia Heaton, and Doris Roberts won at least one Emmy each for their performances.

In 1999, he had a heart attack on the set of Everybody Loves Raymond. He soon regained his health and returned to the series. After the incident, Boyle was drawn back to his Catholic faith and resumed attending Mass.

In 2001, he appeared in the film Monster's Ball as the bigoted father of Billy Bob Thornton's character. Introduced by comedian Carlos Mencia as "the most honest man in show business", Boyle made guest appearances on three episodes of the Comedy Central program Mind of Mencia, one of which was shown as a tribute in a segment made before Boyle's death, in which he read hate mail, explained the "hidden meanings" behind bumper stickers, and occasionally told Mencia how he felt about him.

Starting in late 2005, Boyle and former television wife Doris Roberts appeared in television commercials for the 75th anniversary of Alka-Seltzer, reprising the famous line, "I can't believe I ate that whole thing!" Although this quote has entered into popular culture, it is often misquoted as, "...the whole thing." Boyle was in all three of The Santa Clause films. In the original, he plays Scott Calvin's boss Mr. Whittle. In the sequels, he plays Father Time.

Death
On December 12, 2006, Boyle died at the age of 71 at New York Presbyterian Hospital in New York City after suffering from multiple myeloma and heart disease. At the time of his death, he had completed his roles in the films All Roads Lead Home and The Santa Clause 3: The Escape Clause—the latter being released one month before his death—and was scheduled to appear in The Golden Boys. The end credits of All Roads Lead Home include a dedication to his memory.

Boyle's death had a tremendous effect on his former co-stars from Everybody Loves Raymond, which had ceased production less than two years before his death. When asked to comment on Boyle's death, his cast members heaped praise on Boyle. Ray Romano was personally affected by the loss, saying, "He gave me great advice, he always made me laugh, and the way he connected with everyone around him amazed me." Patricia Heaton stated, "Peter was an incredible man who made all of us who had the privilege of working with him aspire to be better actors."

On October 18, 2007 (which would have been Boyle's 72nd birthday), his friend Bruce Springsteen dedicated "Meeting Across the River" to Boyle during a Madison Square Garden concert with the E Street Band in New York. Springsteen segued into "Jungleland" in memory of Boyle, stating: "An old friend died a while back – we met him when we first came to New York City... Today would have been his birthday."

After Boyle died, his widow Loraine Alterman Boyle established the Peter Boyle Memorial Fund in support of the International Myeloma Foundation (IMF). Boyle's closest friends, family, and co-stars have since gathered yearly for a comedy celebration fundraiser in Los Angeles. Acting as a tribute to Boyle, the annual event is hosted by Ray Romano and has included performances by many comedic veterans including Dana Carvey, Fred Willard, Martin Mull, Richard Lewis, Kevin James, Jeff Garlin, and Martin Short. Performances typically revolve around Boyle's life, recalling favorite moments with the actor. The comedy celebration has been noted as the most successful fundraiser in IMF history. The first event held in 2007 raised over $550,000, while the following year over $600,000 were raised for the Peter Boyle Memorial Fund in support of the IMF's research programs.

He was interred at Green River Cemetery in Springs, New York.

Filmography

Film

Television

Awards and nominations

Emmy Awards (Primetime)

Screen Actors Guild Awards

Other Accolades

References

External links

 
 
 
 
 
 
 MSNBC.com (December 13, 2006): The Daily Nightly: "Remembering Uncle Pete", by Clare Duffy, NBC Nightly News Producer

1935 births
2006 deaths
People from Norristown, Pennsylvania
Male actors from Pennsylvania
Catholics from Pennsylvania
American male film actors
American male stage actors
American male television actors
Deaths from cancer in New York (state)
Deaths from multiple myeloma
Emmy Award winners
La Salle University alumni
United States Navy officers
20th-century American male actors
21st-century American male actors
American male voice actors
American male comedy actors
Burials at Green River Cemetery
American people of Irish descent
American people of French descent
Military personnel from Pennsylvania